Oxydol is a brand of laundry detergent sold in the United States, Canada, and the United Kingdom. It was created in 1914 by Thomas Hedley Co. of Newcastle upon Tyne and purchased by Procter & Gamble in 1927. It was P&G's first laundry soap. In the 1930s, Oxydol was the sponsor of the Ma Perkins radio show, considered the first soap opera; as such, Oxydol sponsorship put the "soap" in "soap opera".  

In the mid-1950s, the soap was suffering declining sales, due in large part to P&G's introduction of its popular detergent, Tide. As a result, the soap formula was discontinued, and Oxydol was transformed into a detergent product, with color safe bleach.

P&G sold the brand in 2000 to Redox Brands, a marketing company founded by former Procter & Gamble employees.  Redox Brands was merged into CR Brands in 2006.

In 2019, the brand was sold to Fab+Kind, which also owns the former US Phoenix Brands detergents.

In 2021, FMCG Global Brands Limited, acquired the Oxydol brand for the United Kingdom.

References

Laundry detergents
Former Procter & Gamble brands

Products introduced in 1914